The Great Britain Speedway Team (also known as GB Speedway Team) is one of the major teams in international speedway. The team is managed by former Great Britain riders Oliver Allen and Simon Stead, and captained by the 2018 Speedway World Champion Tai Woffinden.

Speedway World Cup 
The England national speedway team has won the Speedway World Team Cup on five occasions with the Great Britain side winning four times. They were a major force in the 1970s, winning five consecutive tournaments, two as England and three as Great Britain. Key riding members of the title wins include Peter Collins (five wins), Malcolm Simmons (four wins), New Zealand-born Ivan Mauger, Dave Jessup and Ray Wilson (all three wins). The cup has eluded them since 1989, although they came close in 2000, missing out when Mark Loram fell in a race-off, and 2004 where a team of Mark Loram, Lee Richardson, Gary Havelock, David Norris and Scott Nicholls missed out by one point. Both narrow defeats were at the hands of Sweden and both in somewhat controversial fashion.

Prior to 1974, the Great Britain team often consisted of riders from other Commonwealth Nations including Australia and New Zealand.

New Era 
In 2018, the commercial rights for the Great Britain Speedway Team were acquired on a multi-year deal by VRX Motorsport. A new management team was formed and Tai Woffinden, who made himself unavailable for Great Britain selection in 2016, returned to the team as captain.

Speedway of Nations 
In June 2018, Great Britain competed as one of 15 nations in the inaugural Speedway of Nations tournament. The new format, which replaced the Speedway World Cup, saw each country field a team of three riders in pairs competition, with two opening rounds followed by a two-day final.

GB raced on home soil in Event Two at the National Speedway Stadium against Sweden, Australia, Czech Republic, Italy, France and Finland with the top three teams joining the final hosts Poland and the top three from Event One (Teterow, Germany).

Great Britain finished second on the night, behind Sweden, with Woffinden scoring 14 points, youngster Robert Lambert 8 and Craig Cook 1.

They were joined in the final by Poland, Denmark, Germany, Russia, Sweden and Australia. The team with the highest points total over two days (42 races) would head straight to the Grand Final, racing against the winner of a race-off between 2nd and 3rd place. 

Britain topped the leaderboard after Day One and again after Day Two, but Russia were able to secure a 3-3 in the Grand Final to leave Britain with a silver medal.

Woffinden was the event top scorer with an astonishing 38 points over the two days, while Lambert scored a vital 11.

At the 2021 Speedway of Nations Event in Manchester UK. Speedway Team GB ended 32 years of hurt in the hunt for gold. They first beat Denmark 6-3 (Finishing in 1st and 3rd), in the Grand Final Qualifier after finishing 3rd overall on 64 points after 2 days racing. They then went on to beat Poland in the Grand Final on a 5-4 heat advantage, (Coming 2nd and 3rd) this then secured Team GB the gold medal.

Return of Test Matches 
In August 2018, Great Britain hosted a top-level international test match for the first time in over 15 years when they took on Australia at Glasgow's Peugeot Ashfield Stadium. 

Britain were defeated in front of a large crowd as Australia's superior depth showed.

The seven man team comprised Woffinden, Lambert, Cook, Adam Ellis, Daniel Bewley, Chris Harris and Steven Worrall.

Wins as Great Britain

Wins as England

U-21 Speedway World Cup

Titles

Famous British riders 

 Jim Airey
 Dan Bewley
 Eric Boocock
 Nigel Boocock
 Barry Briggs
 Kenny Carter
 Les Collins
 Peter Collins
 Phil Collins
 Peter Craven
 Chris Harris
 Gary Havelock
 Dave Jessup
 Robert Lambert
 Eric Langton
 Michael Lee
 Mark Loram
 Chris Louis
 John Louis
 Ivan Mauger
 Ken McKinlay
 Ronnie Moore
 Chris Morton
 Scott Nicholls
 Tommy Price
 Lee Richardson
 Joe Screen
 Malcolm Simmons
 Kelvin Tatum
 Tai Woffinden
 Simon Wigg
 Ray Wilson
 Bert Harkins

References

External links
BSPA Website

National speedway teams
Speedway
Speedway in the United Kingdom